Flotsam is a novel first published in 1939 by the German author Erich Maria Remarque. The novel describes the interwoven stories of several immigrants who left Germany at the time of National Socialism.

Plot
The Austrian police raids a boarding house somewhere in Vienna. The young boy Kern and the sagacious Josef Steiner are arrested and evicted for having no passports. In Prague Kern meets Ruth Holland and falls in love with her. The three immigrants are forced to travel through all of Europe in search of a better life. At the end of this odyssey Steiner dies in Germany while he visits his terminally ill wife for the last time. Kern and Ruth are leaving Paris on a train to Spain.

Film
In 1941, the novel was made into the American film So Ends Our Night starring Fredric March and Margaret Sullavan.

References

1939 German novels
German novels adapted into films
Novels by Erich Maria Remarque
Novels set in Europe
Little, Brown and Company books
Hutchinson (publisher) books